Sweden participated in the Eurovision Song Contest 2019. The Swedish broadcaster  (SVT) organised the national final  in order to select the Swedish entry for the 2019 contest in Tel Aviv, Israel. After a six-week-long competition consisting of four heats, a Second Chance round and a final, "Too Late for Love" performed by John Lundvik emerged as the winner after achieving the highest score following the combination of votes from eight international juries and a public vote.

Background 

Sweden had won the contest on six occasions: in 1974 with the song "Waterloo" performed by ABBA, in 1984 with the song "Diggi-Loo Diggi-Ley" performed by Herreys, in 1991 with the song "" performed by Carola, in 1999 with the song "Take Me to Your Heaven" performed by Charlotte Nilsson, in 2012 with the song "Euphoria" performed by Loreen, and in 2015 with the song "Heroes" performed by Måns Zelmerlöw.

The Swedish national broadcaster,  (SVT), broadcasts the event within Sweden and organises the selection process for the nation's entry. Since 1959, SVT has organised the annual competition  in order to select the Swedish entry for the Eurovision Song Contest.

Before Eurovision

Melodifestivalen 2019 

 2019 was the 58th edition of the Swedish music competition  and will be held between 2 February 2019 and 9 March 2019. The four presenters were Sarah Dawn Finer, Kodjo Akolor, Marika Carlsson and Eric Saade. The winner of the contest would represent Sweden in the Eurovision Song Contest 2019 in Tel Aviv, Israel.

Heats and Second Chance round 
"Not with Me" performed by Wiktoria and "Hello" performed by Mohombi qualified directly to the final, while "Ashes to Ashes" performed by Anna Bergendahl and "Chasing Rivers" performed by Nano advanced to the Second Chance round. "No Drama" performed by High15, "" performed by Zeana featuring Anis don Demina, and "" performed by Arja Saijonmaa were eliminated from the contest.
 The second heat took place on 9 February 2019 at the Malmö Arena in Malmö. "Hold You" performed by Hanna Ferm and Liamoo and "I Do Me" performed by Malou Prytz qualified directly to the final, while "" performed by Vlad Reiser and "Army of Us" performed by Andreas Johnson advanced to the Second Chance round. "I Love It" performed by Oscar Enestad, "" performed by Jan Malmsjö, and "Tempo" performed by Margaret were eliminated from the contest.
 The third heat took place on 16 February 2019 at the Tegera Arena in Leksand. "Norrsken (Goeksegh)" performed by Jon Henrik Fjällgren and "Victorious" performed by Lina Hedlund qualified directly to the final, while "Who I Am" performed by Rebecka Karlsson and "" performed by Martin Stenmarck advanced to the Second Chance round. "Somebody Wants" performed by the Lovers of Valdaro, "Habibi" performed by Dolly Style, and "" performed by Omar Rudberg were eliminated from the contest.
 The fourth heat took place on 23 February 2019 at the Sparbanken Lidköping Arena in Lidköping. "Too Late for Love" performed by John Lundvik and "On My Own" performed by Bishara qualified directly to the final, while "Torn" performed by Lisa Ajax and "I Do" performed by Arvingarna advanced to the Second Chance round. "Stormbringer" performed by Pagan Fury, "" performed by Anton Hagman, and "" performed by Ann-Louise Hanson were eliminated from the contest.
 The Second Chance round took place on 2 March 2019 at the Rosvalla Nyköping Eventcenter in Nyköping. "Ashes to Ashes" performed by Anna Bergendahl, "Chasing Rivers" performed by Nano, "Torn" performed by Lisa Ajax, and "I Do" performed by Arvingarna qualified to the final.

Final 
The final took place on 9 March 2019 at the Friends Arena in Solna, Stockholm. Twelve songs competed — two qualifiers from each of the four preceding heats and four qualifiers from the Second Chance round. The combination of points from a viewer vote and eight international jury groups determined the winner, John Lundvik with the song "Too Late for Love". The viewers and the juries each had a total of 464 points to award.

At Eurovision
According to Eurovision rules, all nations with the exceptions of the host country and the "Big Five" (France, Germany, Italy, Spain and the United Kingdom) are required to qualify from one of two semi-finals in order to compete for the final; the top ten countries from each semi-final progress to the final. The European Broadcasting Union (EBU) split up the competing countries into six different pots based on voting patterns from previous contests, with countries with favourable voting histories put into the same pot. On 28 January 2019, a special allocation draw was held which placed each country into one of the two semi-finals, as well as which half of the show they would perform in. Sweden was placed into the second semi-final, to be held on 16 May 2019, and was scheduled to perform in the first half of the show.

Once all the competing songs for the 2019 contest had been released, the running order for the semi-finals was decided by the shows' producers rather than through another draw, so that similar songs were not placed next to each other. Sweden was set to perform in position 8, following the entry from Denmark and preceding the entry from Austria.

Semi-final
Sweden performed eighth in the second semi-final, following the entry from Denmark and preceding the entry from Austria. At the end of the show, Sweden was announced as having finished in the top 10 and subsequently qualifying for the grand final. It was later revealed that Sweden placed third in the semi-final, receiving a total of 238 points: 88 points from the televoting and 150 points from the juries.

Voting
Voting during the three shows involved each country awarding two sets of points from 1-8, 10 and 12: one from their professional jury and the other from televoting. Each nation's jury consisted of five music industry professionals who are citizens of the country they represent, with their names published before the contest to ensure transparency. This jury judged each entry based on: vocal capacity; the stage performance; the song's composition and originality; and the overall impression by the act. In addition, no member of a national jury was permitted to be related in any way to any of the competing acts in such a way that they cannot vote impartially and independently. The individual rankings of each jury member as well as the nation's televoting results were released shortly after the grand final.

Points awarded to Sweden

Points awarded by Sweden

Detailed voting results
The following members comprised the Swedish jury:
 Calvin Bozic (jury chairperson)PR and project leader record company
 Mathias Lugoboniassistant music director
 Lina Hedlundartist
 Adnan Sahuricdancer and choreographer
 Haida Jamshidi

References

External links
 Official SVT Eurovision website

2019
Countries in the Eurovision Song Contest 2019
Eurovision
Eurovision